Chris Tarry (born 24 August 1970) is a Canadian bass guitarist who is a member of the band Metalwood. Since 1993 he has led the Chris Tarry Group.

Discography

As leader
 Unition (Adam, 1996)
 Sponge with Dylan van der Schyff (Spool, 1998)
 Project 33 (Black Hen, 2002)
 Sorry to Be Strange (Cellar Live, 2006)
 Almost Certainly Dreaming (Nineteen-eight, 2008)

As sideman
With Metalwood
 Metalwood (Maximum, 1997)
 2 (Maximum, 1998)
 The Recline (Telarc, 2001)
 Twenty (Cellar Live, 2016)

With Peggy Lee Band
 The Peggy Lee Band (Spool, 1999)
 Sounds from the Big House (Spool, 2002)

References

External links
Official site
Interview

1970 births
Canadian expatriate musicians in the United States
Canadian jazz bass guitarists
Juno Award for Contemporary Jazz Album of the Year winners
Living people
People from Swift Current
21st-century Canadian bass guitarists
Black Hen Music artists